The Zincke nitration is a nitration reaction in which a bromine is replaced by a nitro group on an electron-rich aryl compound such as a phenol or cresol. Typical reagents are nitrous acid or sodium nitrite. The reaction is a manifestation of nucleophilic aromatic substitution and is named after Theodor Zincke, who first reported it in 1900.

Two examples:

and: 

The Zincke nitration should not be confused with the Zincke–Suhl reaction or the Zincke reaction.

See also 
 Menke nitration

References

Nitration reactions
Substitution reactions
Name reactions
1900 in science